Limnichthys rendahli is a species of sandburrower endemic to the waters around New Zealand to depths of about 150 m, on sandy or gravelly bottoms.  Its length is between 3 and 8 cm.

References

Limnichthys
Endemic marine fish of New Zealand
Fish described in 1958